The Space Surveillance Telescope (SST) is a Southern Hemisphere based military telescope used for detecting, tracking and cataloguing satellites, near-Earth objects and space debris. 

In 2011, SST achieved first light at the White Sands Missile Range, New Mexico, United States. From there it began  observing the Southern Celestial Hemisphere and collecting data for the US Space Surveillance Network. the repositioned SST achieved first light in Australia on March 5, 2020. The SST entered initial operational capability on October 4th, 2022  and is operated by the Royal Australian Air Force, 1 Remote Sensor Unit under the command and control (C2) of the U.S. Space Force.

Purpose
The SST primarily enables the military to track and identify objects and threats in space including space debris, as well as predict and avoid potential collisions. Whether it is space traffic management or the protection of critical space-based capabilities, SST maintains real-time awareness of the space domain of both the U.S. and Australia. The discovery and tracking of space debris is a growing problem. Among the 20-30 thousand large objects in orbit that are tracked, an estimated 100 million objects some as small as paint flecks are harder to track than the larger objects, but large enough to shield against if they collide with a space asset. Paint flecks are known to cause damage mainly due to the extreme velocity that they travel in orbit. In other words, there are objects too big to easily shield against, but too small to track. Another concern is the Kessler syndrome, a chain reaction of collisions, creating far more space debris dangerous to working satellites. Another concern are near-Earth asteroids, that the SST also tracks as part of its mission.

Design

The SST was sponsored by DARPA and designed by the Massachusetts Institute of Technology Lincoln Laboratory.  

SST has a 3.5 meter (138″) aperture mirror. Two noted design features include a Mersenne-Schmidt type optics and curved CCD. The large curved focal surface array sensors are considered to be an innovative design. It encompasses improvements in detection sensitivity, has short focal length, wide field of view, and improvements in step-and-settle abilities.  

SST detects, tracks, and can discern small, obscure objects, in deep space with a "wide field of view system".  It is a single telescope with the dual abilities. First the  telescope is sensitive enough to  allow for detection, also, of small, dimly lit objects (low reflectivity). Second it is capable of quickly searching the visible sky. This combination is a difficult achievement in a single telescope design.

It is a Mersenne-Schmidt design with an F/1.0 aperture and a 3.5 meter primary mirror. It uses an array of charge-coupled device (CCD) sensors, arranged on a curved focal plane array.  The SST mount uses an advanced servo-control technology, that makes it one of the quickest and most agile telescopes of its size. It has a field of view of 6 square degrees and can scan the visible sky at night on clear nights down to apparent magnitude 20.5. These features allow the system to conduct multiple searches throughout the night, including the entire geostationary belt within its field.

As a telescope system, it can give precise locations of discovered objects, extrapolate the courses of individual objects and determine their stability.

The SST is notable in the number of observations it makes and is currently listed by the Minor Planet Center as the world record holder for making the most observations in a single year. In 2015 it made a record 6.97 million observations, significantly more than any other telescope, including Pan-STARRS which is currently in second place, having recorded 5.25 million observations in its best year so far (2014).

See also

United States Space Surveillance Network
List of largest optical reflecting telescopes
Space debris
Near-earth objects
Satellites
Asteroid impact prediction

References

Notes

External links 
 Asteroid Detection with the Space Surveillance Telescope

Optical telescopes
United States Space Surveillance Network
Military equipment introduced in the 2010s